Folsom Boulevard is a major east–west arterial in Sacramento County, California in the United States. Its western terminus is at Alhambra Boulevard in the East Sacramento section of Sacramento and its eastern terminus is at Greenback Lane in Folsom.

The actual road, however, runs from the California State Capitol (at 15th Street) in Sacramento to the city of Auburn in Placer County and has various changes of name along the way, which includes Capitol Avenue (old M Street), Folsom-Auburn Road and Auburn-Folsom Road.

For much of the route, it runs nearly parallel with U.S. Route 50 and was that highway's alignment before the freeway was completed in the 1970s.

Route description

Sacramento
Folsom Boulevard begins in the East Sacramento neighborhood (in a southeasterly direction) as a two-lane roadway, expanding to four lanes at 59th Street. After passing the intersection of 65th Street, Folsom Boulevard is reduced to two lanes as it runs beneath the Union Pacific railroad tracks via a short subway tunnel. After passing under U.S. Route 50, Folsom Boulevard once again expands to four lanes and will remain that way at least for the remainder of the route. Folsom Boulevard intersects Howe Avenue and Power Inn Road, overlapping State Route 16 for roughly 1/2 mile (0.8 km). SR 16 departs Folsom Boulevard for Jackson Road and Folsom Boulevard turns in a northeasterly direction, paralleling the Sacramento Regional Transit light rail tracks. As it reaches Watt Avenue, Folsom Boulevard leaves the city of Sacramento and into the suburb communities of La Riviera and Rosemont.

La Riviera/Rosemont/Rancho Cordova
Folsom Boulevard continues its northeasterly direction through La Riviera and Rosemont, passing under US 50 for the second time. As it reaches the intersection of Bradshaw Road, Folsom Boulevard enters the city of Rancho Cordova. It then intersects other major intersections, including Mather Field Road, Coloma Road and Zinfandel Drive. Folsom Boulevard passes under US 50 for the third time, intersecting Sunrise Boulevard (County Route E2). It begins to closely parallel US 50 until it intersects Hazel Avenue, leaving Rancho Cordova en route to the city of Folsom.

Folsom
As Folsom Boulevard reaches Folsom, it meets up with US 50 for a fourth and final time at an interchange. While US 50 continues east towards South Lake Tahoe, Folsom Boulevard turns north towards historic downtown Folsom. It then crosses the American River, ending at the intersection of Greenback Lane. The road itself continues north as Folsom-Auburn Road.

Landmarks and points of interest
East Lawn Memorial Cemetery
California State University Sacramento
Granite Regional Park
Folsom Premium Outlets
Historic Folsom

Major cities
Sacramento, California
Rancho Cordova, California
Folsom, California

Local transportation
The Gold Line of Sacramento Regional Transit's light rail line runs along much of Folsom Boulevard. Several stations are located along the corridor and they include:

University/65th Street and Power Inn are nearby stations that also serve Folsom Boulevard.

RT buses 21, 26, 28, 61, 80, 84 operate on portions of Folsom Boulevard.

Folsom Stage Line Route 10 operates on portions of Folsom Boulevard.

Major intersections

References

Streets in Sacramento County, California
Transportation in Sacramento, California
Folsom, California
Boulevards in the United States
Lincoln Highway
U.S. Route 50